Julie Hynes (born January 15, 1989 in St. John's, Newfoundland as Julie Devereaux) is a Canadian curler from Newfoundland and Labrador. She currently plays second on Team Stacie Curtis.

Career

Junior career
Hynes joined her sister Stacie Curtis' junior team in 2004 as her second. They would represent Newfoundland and Labrador at the 2005 Canadian Junior Curling Championships, finishing with a 5–7 record. The sisters returned to the Juniors in 2006, this time with Hynes throwing lead rocks. There they finished with a 5–6 record. 2007 would be their breakthrough year, when they represented their province for a third time. Team win finished in first place after the round robin at the 2007 Canadian Junior Curling Championships. The team then dispelled Manitoba in the final to claim the Canadian Junior championship crown. The rink represented Canada at the 2007 World Junior Curling Championships, where they would win a silver medal, after losing to Scotland's Sarah Reid in the final.

With Curtis graduating from the junior ranks, Hynes would form her own junior team with Stephanie Davis, Jessica Mouland and Erica Trickett. The team would represent Newfoundland and Labrador at the 2008 Canadian Junior Curling Championships. Hynes led her rink to a 5–7 record.

Women's career
After juniors, Hynes joined back with her sister's rink. The team played in the 2009 Newfoundland and Labrador Scotties Tournament of Hearts, finishing with a 2–4 record. After the season, Hynes left competitive curling, only playing for the team as their alternate. Hynes was the team's alternate at the 2011 Scotties Tournament of Hearts (1–10 record) and the 2013 Scotties Tournament of Hearts (2–9 record), playing in just one game each. Hynes would return to the team as a full member in 2014 at the second position. The team would play at the 2015 Newfoundland and Labrador Scotties Tournament of Hearts, but did not win any games. However, they found more success the next season, running the table at the 2016 Newfoundland and Labrador Scotties Tournament of Hearts, qualifying for the 2016 Scotties Tournament of Hearts. At the Hearts, the team finished a 3-8 record. The team also won the 2017 Newfoundland and Labrador Scotties Tournament of Hearts and represented the province at the 2017 Scotties Tournament of Hearts, where they finished with an improved 5-6 record. The team won a third straight provincial title at the 2018 Newfoundland and Labrador Scotties Tournament of Hearts. At the 2018 Scotties Tournament of Hearts, they finished pool play with a 4-3 record, but lost to Ontario in a tiebreaker, missing a chance to go to the championship round.

Stacie Curtis would move to Miami, forcing Hynes to find a new team. Hynes played lead the Erica Curtis (Trickett) rink at the 2019 Newfoundland and Labrador Scotties Tournament of Hearts, but missed the playoffs. The next year, she moved to the second position on the team, and won the 2020 Newfoundland and Labrador Scotties Tournament of Hearts. At the 2020 Scotties Tournament of Hearts, the team went 1-6 in group play. Also that season, Hynes played lead for Team Scheidegger at the 2019 National Grand Slam event, filling in for Kristie Moore who skipped in lieu of Casey Scheidegger who was on maternity leave. The team finished 1-3 in pool play.

Personal life
Hynes is employed as a registered nurse with Eastern Health. She is married to Justin Hynes.

References

External links

1989 births
Curlers from Newfoundland and Labrador
Living people
Canadian women curlers
Sportspeople from St. John's, Newfoundland and Labrador
Canadian nurses
Canadian women nurses